The women's 1500 metres event at the 2015 African Games was held on 17 September.

Results

References

1500
2015 in women's athletics